Xinyi railway station is a station on Longhai railway in Xinyi, Xuzhou, Jiangsu.

History
The station was established in 1925.

Formerly named as Xin'anzhen railway station, the station was changed to the current name in 1952, to differentiate it from Xin'an County in Luoyang, Henan.

References

Railway stations in Jiangsu
Stations on the Longhai Railway
Railway stations in China opened in 1925
Stations on the Jiaozhou–Xinyi railway